National Intelligence Coordination Committee may refer to:
National Committee for Intelligence Coordination of Bangladesh
National Intelligence Coordination Committee (Australia)
National Intelligence Coordination Committee (Pakistan)